The Libyan pound (Arabic جنيه, junieh; sign: £L) was the currency of Libya between 1951 and 1971. It was divided into 100 piastres (قرش, qirsh) and 1000 milliemes (مليم).

History 
When Libya was a part of the Ottoman Empire, the country used the Ottoman qirsh, issuing some coins locally until 1844. When Italy took over the country in 1911, the Italian lira was introduced. In 1943, Libya was split into French and British mandate territories. Algerian francs were used in the French mandate, whilst Tripolitanian lira issued by the British military authorities were used in the British mandate.

In 1951, the pound was introduced, replacing the franc and lira at rates of £L1 = 480 lire = 980 francs and was equal in value to the pound sterling. While sterling was devalued in 1967, the Libyan pound did not follow suit (resulting in £L1 being worth £1 3s 4d stg). The pound was replaced, at par, by the dinar in 1971 following the Libyan Revolution of 1969.

Coins 
Coins were issued in 1952 in denominations of 1, 2, and 5 milliemes, and 1 and 2 piastres. In 1965, a second series of coins was issued in denominations of 1, 5, 10, 20, 50, and 100 milliemes. These coins continued to circulate  after 1971 as no new coins were issued until 1975.

Banknotes 
In 1951, the government issued notes in denominations of 5 and 10 piastres, £L, £L, £L1, £L5, and £L10. In 1959, the National Bank of Libya took over the issuance of paper money with denominations of £L, £L1, £L5, and £L10. In 1963, the Bank of Libya took over from the National Bank and issued notes in the same denominations.

References 

Currencies of Libya
Economic history of Libya
Modern obsolete currencies
1951 establishments in Libya
1971 disestablishments